Afa or AFA may refer to:

Mythology and religion
Afa (mythology), in the Polynesian mythology of Samoa
Afá, a West African religion, also known as Ifá in some languages

Governmental
Agence française anticorruption, the French Anti-Corruption Agency
Afa, Corse-du-Sud, a commune in Corsica
Afghani (currency), the currency of Afghanistan
Alberta Foundation for the Arts, arts funding body of Alberta, Canada
Andorran Financial Authority, the financial regulator of Andorra

Sports figures
Afa Anoaʻi, Sr. (born 1942), professional wrestler
Afa Anoaʻi Jr. (born 1984), professional wrestler

Entertainment
 Anime Festival Asia, annual ACG event in Southeast Asian countries
 ARY Film Awards, a Pakistani Film Awarding Ceremony
 Anthology Film Archives, a film archive and theater

Organizations

Argentina
Argentine Football Association

Australia
Aborigines' Friends' Association
Atheist Foundation of Australia
Australian Family Association

Austria
Academic Forum for Foreign Affairs
Austrian Football Association

Germany
Agentur für Arbeit
Antifaschistische Aktion
Accumulatoren-Fabrik AFA

Sweden
Antifascistisk aktion

Taiwan
Agriculture and Food Agency

United Kingdom
Amateur Fencing Association, former name of British Fencing Association
Amateur Football Alliance, formerly Amateur Football Association
Anti-Fascist Action
Atrial Fibrillation Association
Associate Financial Accountant in the Institute of Financial Accountants
Approved Franchise Association, one of three trade associations for the UK franchising industry.

United States

Military
Admiral Farragut Academy
Air Force Academy (United States)
Air Force Association
Air Force Academy, Colorado, a locality occupied by the U.S. Air Force Academy

Sports
American Football Association (1884–1924), first organization for association football (soccer) in the U.S.
American Football Association (1978–1983), a minor professional gridiron football league
American Freestyle Association, governing body for bicycle motocross (BMX) freestyle during the 1980s
Arena Football Association, a minor professional indoor gridiron football league

Other
Advertising Federation of America
Ad Fontes Academy
American Family Association
American Farrier's Association
American Federation of Arts
American Federation of Astrologers
American Finance Association
American Flyers Airline
American Forensics Association
American Forestry Association
American Freedom Agenda
Arkansas Fire Academy
Asatru Folk Assembly, formerly Asatru Free Assembly
Association of Flight Attendants

In other countries
Asian Farmers' Association for Sustainable Rural Development

Other uses
AFA (automobile), a Spanish automobile
Air force academy
IATA code of San Rafael Airport (Argentina)
Alternating finite automaton, in computer science
Anti-Foundation Axiom, a mathematical axiom
Afro-Asiatic languages (ISO 639-3 code)
Aphanizomenon flos-aquae, an edible blue-green algae
Asian Film Awards, an annual Hong Kong award
Brazilian Air Force Academy
Portuguese Air Force Academy
Amfonelic acid, a stimulant and hallucinogen
Afa, a diminutive of the Russian female first name Aviafa
AFA, an all-flash array in computing.